Anthony J. Pope (March 22, 1947 – February 11, 2004), also known as "Anthony Mozdy," was an American voice actor. He is best remembered for voicing Goofy for eleven years. He also worked on the first two DVDs of LeapFrog, voicing Mr. Websley and Professor Quigley on The Letter Factory and Talking Words Factory (2003).

Early life 
Anthony J. Pope was born in Cleveland, Ohio, on March 22, 1947.

Career 
After graduating from college, Pope moved to Los Angeles, California in 1973 were he officially began his career as a voice actor. He was known for providing the voice of Furby in English and five other languages. He was also the voice of Goofy for eleven years garnering seventeen Gold and Platinum records. His voice is prominent at Disneyland on several rides, as well as in the JumpStart products by Knowledge Adventure.

Personal life 
Pope married actress Patricia Lentz in 1984, together they have three children. They remained married until his death in 2004.

Death 
He died on February 11, 2004, from complications of leg surgery at the age of 56 in Burbank, California. He was buried at Forest Lawn – Hollywood Hills Cemetery. He was survived by his wife and three children, his daughter Marcella Lentz-Pope is an actress.

Filmography

Film 

 The Adventures of Pinocchio (1978) – Candlewick / Boy
 Hurray for Betty Boop (1980) – Coffee Shoppe Boss / "Indy 500" Announcer / Mirror, Ringmaster (voice)
 The Little Fox (1981) – Karak (voice)
 Back to the Future (1985) – 1985 Radio Announcer (voice, uncredited)
 Invasion Earth: The Aliens Are Here (1988) – Alien (voice)
 Who Framed Roger Rabbit (1988) – Goofy / Zeke "Big Bad" Wolf (voice)
 Spaced Invaders (1990) – Lieutenant Giggywig (voice)
 Watchers II (1990) – Outsider (voice)
 Armour of God 2: Operation Condor (1991) – (voice)
 Frozen Assets (1992) – (voice)
 Cats Don't Dance (1997) – Alligator (voice)
 The King and I (1999) – Burmese Emissary (voice)
 The Prince of Light (2000) – Vishwarmitra
 Metropolis – Shunsaku Ban (voice)
 Dak mo mai sing (2001) – (voice)
 Shu shan zheng zhuan (2001) – (voice)
 Marco Polo: Return to Xanadu (2001) – Babu / Foo-Ling / Reginald the Seagull (voice)
 Muhammad: The Last Prophet (2002) – Salman (voice)

Anime 
 The Adventures of Pinocchio (1971) – Lucignolo / Boy at Puppet Theatre
 Galaxy Express 999 (1979) – Unspecified Role (New World Pictures Dub)
 Mobile Suit Gundam Trilogy (1979–1980, TV Series) – General Revil
 Kidô Senshi Gundam (1981) – General Revil
 Kidô senshi Gandamu II: Ai senshihen (1981) – General Revil
 Kidô Senshi Gundam III: Meguriai Sorahen (1982) – General Revil
 Wings of Honneamize (1987) – Majaho / Tekatta
 Akira (1988) – Colonel Shikishima / Mr. Nezu / Yamagata (as Anthony Mozdy)
 Hello Kitty's Paradise (1999, TV Series) – Papa
 Mobile Suit Gundam F91 (1991) – Leslie Arno
 Ramayana: The Legend of Prince Rama (1992) – Sage Vishvamitra
 Apocalypse Zero (1996) – Oboro Hagakure
 Black Jack: The Movie (1996)
 Fake (1996) – Chief / Jaco
 Rurouni Kenshin (1996–1999, TV Series) – Kaishu Katsu
 Sun faa sau si (1998) – Boss / Sushi Chef / Movie Actor 1 / Zombies
 Vampire Princess Miyu (1998, TV Series) – Tonbi
 The Adventures of Mini-Goddess (1998–2003, TV Series) – Gan-chan
 The Big O (1999, TV Series) – Gisang
 Dinozaurs (2000, TV Series)
 Samurai Girl: Real Bout High School (2001, TV Series) – Master Tessai Onizuka
 S-CRY-ed (2001, TV Series) – Chief
 Cyborg 009 (2002, TV Series) – Commander / Dr.Herschel
 Digimon Tamers (2002, TV Series) – Zhuqiaomon
 Ai Yori Aoshi (2002, TV Series) – Fish Vendor / Kaoru's Grandfather
 Mao-chan (2002, TV Series) – Sorajirou Tsukishima
 Heat Guy J (2002, TV Series) – Mauro (1st Voice "replaced by Steve Kramer after his death")

Animation 
 Spider-Man (1981, TV Series) – Boris
 Pole Position (1984, TV Series short)
 The Jetsons (1985, TV Series)
 Care Bears (1985–1988, DiC series, only in "Forest of Misfortune/The Magic Mirror") – Frostbite
 The Transformers (1986–1987, TV Series) – A3 / Wreck-Gar
 Sport Goofy in Soccermania (1987) – Sport Goofy
 Tom & Jerry Kids Show (1990–1994, TV Series)
 Droopy, Master Detective (1993–1994, TV Series)
 SWAT Kats (1993, TV Series) – Enforcer Sergeant
 Creepy Crawlers (1994–1995, TV Series) – Professor Googengrime
 What a Cartoon! (1995–1997, Episodes: "Look Out Below" and "George and Junior's Christmas Spectacular") – Junior
 I Am Weasel (1997, TV Series) – Boy / Cousteau
 101 Dalmatians: The Series (1997, TV Series) – Danny
 If You Love Me... Show Me! (1999, Short) – Father Time / Commercial Voice C / Paul's Father
 Disney's House of Mouse (2001–2003, TV Series) – Geppetto
 LeapFrog (2003, TV Series) – Mr. Websley / Professor Quigley (2 DVDs, as Anthony Mozdy)

Video games 
 Sam & Max Hit the Road (1993) – Mad Scientist / Flint Paper / Conroy Bumpus / Various characters
 JumpStart Kindergarten (1994) – Mr. Hopsalot
 Ace Ventura: The Case of the Serial Shaver (1994) – Shickadance
 JumpStart 1st Grade (1995) – Frankie
 JumpStart Adventures 4th Grade: Haunted Island (1996) – Flap
 JumpStart Adventures 3rd Grade: Mystery Mountain (1996)
 JumpStart 2nd Grade (1996) – Edison
 JumpStart 1st Grade Math (1997) – Frankie
 JumpStart Kindergarten Reading (1998) – Mr. Hopsalot
 JumpStart Math (1998) – Edison
 Disney's Villains' Revenge (1999) – Out
 Diablo II (2000) – Elzix, Guard
 JumpStart 1st Grade Reading (2000) – Frankie
 Kingdom Hearts (2002) – Geppetto
 Monopoly Party (2002) – Mr. Monopoly

Other 
 Disney Discovery Series (1984–1987, read-along recordings) – Goofy (recurring) and Ludwig Von Drake ("Colors and Shapes")
 Teddy Ruxpin (1986, read-along recordings) – Newton Gimmick, L.B. the Bounder
 Robbery on the Overland Express: A Whoodunit Mickey Mystery (1993, Disney's Storyteller Series) – Heinrich Schniffengraul
 The Lion King: The Brightest Star (1994) – Cheetah (read-along cassette story recording)
 The Emperor's New Groove (2000, Disney's Storyteller Series) – Narrator
 Furby (1998) – Voice of the Furby toy

References

External links 

1947 births
2004 deaths
American male voice actors
American male video game actors
Male actors from Cleveland
Burials at Forest Lawn Memorial Park (Hollywood Hills)
Audiobook narrators